Upper Thomson is a subzone within the planning area of Bishan, Singapore, as defined by the Urban Redevelopment Authority (URA). Its boundary is composed of Ang Mo Kio Avenue 1 in the north; Marymount Road in the east; Braddell Road and Lornie Road in the south; and the planning area of Central Water Catchment in the west.

References

Bishan, Singapore
Central Region, Singapore